Nicholas Stargardt (born in 1962) is Professor of History at Oxford University, currently serving as Vice President of Magdalen College.

Stargardt is the son of a German-Jewish father and Australian mother. He was born in Melbourne, Australia, and lived in Australia, Japan, England and Germany. He studied at King's College, Cambridge, and is a fellow of Magdalen College, Oxford, in the United Kingdom, where he teaches modern European history. He has written widely on the history of modern Germany, political and social thought and the Holocaust. He has two sons.

He is the author of The German Idea of Militarism: Radical and Socialist Critics (1994), an intellectual and political history of anti-militarist movements in Germany before the First World War, and of Witnesses of War: Children’s Lives under the Nazis (2005), which offered the first social history of Nazi Germany in the Second World War through the eyes of children. His 2015 book, The German War, explores the attitudes of German citizens during the Second World War.

References

Bibliography
The German Idea of Militarism: Radical and Socialist Critics 1866-1914, 1994, Cambridge. 
Witnesses of War: Children's Lives under the Nazis, Jonathan Cape, 2005, .
The German War: A Nation Under Arms, 1939-1945 Bodley Head/Basic Books, 2015.

External links
Biography - Oxford University
Book Review - The Guardian
Book Review - The Times

1962 births
Living people
Australian people of German-Jewish descent
Fellows of Magdalen College, Oxford
Historians of Nazism
Historians of World War II
Australian historians